JPMorgan Global Growth and Income is a large British investment trust. Established in 1887, it is dedicated to investing in companies worldwide. The Chairman is Tristan Hillgarth. It is listed on the London Stock Exchange and FTSE Russell announced on 1 August 2022 that it would become a constituent of the FTSE 250 Index on 4 August 2022. 

The company was established as the United British Securities Trust in 1887, became the Fleming Overseas Investment Trust in 1982, went on to be the JPMorgan Fleming Overseas Investment Trust in 2002, and then became JP Morgan Overseas Investment Trust in 2006 before adopted its current name in 2016. In October 2021, Scottish Investment Trust completed a strategic review and proposed a combination of assets with JPMorgan Global Growth & Income. Although the merger was supported by the board of JPMorgan Global Growth & Income, shareholders were warned that it may take many months for the merger to be completed.

References

External links
  Official site

Investment trusts of the United Kingdom
JPMorgan Chase